The cycling competition at the 1956 Summer Olympics in Melbourne consisted of two road cycling events and four track cycling events, all for men only.

Medal summary

Road cycling

Track cycling

Participating nations
161 cyclists from 30 nations competed.

Medal table

References

 
1956 Summer Olympics events
1956
1956 in track cycling
1956 in road cycling
1956 in cycle racing